In IT security, a ticket is a number generated by a network server for a client, which can be delivered to itself, or a different server as a means of authentication or proof of authorization, and cannot easily be forged. This usage of the word originated with MIT's Kerberos protocol in the 1980s. Tickets may either be transparent, meaning they can be recognized without contacting the server that generated them; or opaque, meaning the original server must be contacted to verify that it issued the ticket.

Some magic cookies provide the same functionality as a ticket.

Computer network security